Gymnoscelis biangulata is a moth in the family Geometridae first described by Charles Swinhoe in 1902. It is found on Sumbawa in Indonesia.

References

Moths described in 1902
Gymnoscelis